Nandita Debbarma Reang is an Indian politician of the Tipra Motha Party. She is a member of the 2023 Tripura Legislative Assembly, representing the Raima Valley Assembly constituency.

References 

Living people
Year of birth missing (living people)
Tipra Motha Party politicians
Tripura MLAs 2023–2028